Mylom  is a village in Kollam district in the state of Kerala, India.

Demographics
 India census, Mylom had a population of 22425 with 10729 males and 11696 females.

References

Villages in Kollam district